Chak Jani  north of Jhelum district. The Tehsil of this village is Pind Dadan Khan, Province Punjab, Pakistan

Basic Facilities 
The village has an Elementary School for the basic education of boys and girls. And the main health center of the government here for Basic Health Unit facilities is health.

Reference 

Populated places in Tehsil Pind Dadan Khan